Thomas Grey (by 1519–1558), of Norwich, Norfolk, was an English politician.

He was a Member of Parliament (MP) for Norwich in 1555.

References

1558 deaths
Politicians from Norwich
English MPs 1555
Year of birth uncertain